Baron , born , was a Japanese statesman, politician, and businessman in Meiji-period Japan.

Early life 
Maejima was born as Ueno Fusagorō, in the village of Shimoikebe, Echigo Province (present-day the city of Jōetsu, Niigata Prefecture). In 1866 he was adopted into the Maejima family. He was sent to Edo to study rangaku, medical science and English. In the Bakumatsu period he was considered a radical reformer and proponent of westernization. In 1866, he submitted an unsolicited proposal to shōgun Tokugawa Yoshinobu that Japan abolish the use of kanji (Chinese characters) in its writing system. In 1868, shortly after the Meiji Restoration, he also proposed to Ōkubo Toshimichi that the capital of Japan be moved from Kyoto to Edo.

Meiji bureaucrat 
Ōkubo liked the gall of the upstart Maejima, and appointed him to the new Minbu-shō (Ministry for Popular Affairs) in the new Meiji government, where his outspoken attitude caught the attention of Itō Hirobumi and Ōkuma Shigenobu. He was sent to Great Britain in 1870 to study the workings of the General Post Office, and upon his return to Japan in 1871, his proposals for the creation of a similar system in Japan were quickly approved.

The Japanese post office began operation in April 1871 with a daily service linking Tokyo with Osaka, with 65 post offices in between. Maejima personally coined the Japanese word for postage stamp (kitte). To make the system self-supporting, and to extend the modern economic system into the Japanese countryside, Maejima also created a system of postal savings banks in 1874. This system expanded to include money orders in 1875.

In 1874, Maejima hired a foreign advisor, Samuel M. Bryan, to negotiate a postal treaty with the United States, and to assist in the admission of Japan into the Universal Postal Union in 1877.

In 1878, Maejima was appointed to the Genrōin, and in 1879, he was appointed Vice Minister for Home Affairs. By the time Maejima retired in 1881, the Japanese postal system had expanded to 5,099 post offices and was continuing to grow.

Occupations 
While establishing the postal system, Maejima somehow also found time to start his own newspaper in 1872. The Yubin Hochi Shimbun was renamed the Hochi Shimbun in 1894, and was merged with the Yomiuri Shimbun in 1942.

Not content with two careers, Maejima also found time to assist Ōkuma Shigenobu in establishing the Tokyo Semmon Gakkō in 1882, of which he served as principal from 1886 to 1890. The school was renamed Waseda University in 1902.

Seeing the potential for profit in the rapidly expanding railroad network in Japan, in 1886 Maejima established the Kansai Railroad Company in Osaka. He followed in this career by establishing a second railroad company, the Hokuetsu Railway connecting Niigata with Naoetsu in 1894.

Meanwhile. Maejima and Okuma helped establish the Rikken Kaishintō political party. He was appointed as Vice Minister of Communications from 1888 to 1891, during which time he established Japan's state-owned telephone service.

Ennobled with the title of danshaku (baron) under the kazoku peerage system in 1902, he served as a member of the House of Peers from 1904 to 1910. He died in 1919 at his summer cottage in Yokosuka, Kanagawa Prefecture.

As one would expect, he has been honored on several Japanese postage stamps.

Notes

References 
 Cobbing, Andrew. (1989). The Japanese Discovery of Victorian Britain. London: RoutledgeCurzon. .
 __. (2000). The Satsuma Students in Britain. London: RoutledgeCurzon. 
 Jansen, Marius B. (2000). The Making of Modern Japan. Cambridge: Harvard University Press. ; OCLC 44090600
 Keene, Donald. (2002). Emperor of Japan: Meiji and His World, 1852–1912. New York: Columbia University Press. ; OCLC 46731178

Further reading

External links 

 
 Maejima Memorial Museum in Joetsu City, Niigata
 Communications Museum in Tokyo
 Maejima, Hisoka at National Diet Library, Japan

1835 births
1919 deaths
People from Niigata Prefecture
Presidents of universities and colleges in Japan
Meiji Restoration
Members of the House of Peers (Japan)
Kazoku
People of Meiji-period Japan
Postal pioneers
Rikken Kaishintō politicians
19th-century Japanese politicians
Politicians from Niigata Prefecture